Myripristis botche, the blacktip soldierfish, splendid soldierfish, or splendid squirrelfish, is a species of soldierfish belonging to the family Holocentridae.

Description
Myripristis botche can reach a length of about  TL. These fishes have 11 dorsal spines and 4 anal spines. The front of head is red, while the postorbital head and the body is silvery white, with red edges of scales. Soft dorsal, anal and caudal fin show white margins and black tips. Paired fins are white.

This species can be found in the aquarium trade.

Behavior
This fish likes to hide in caves or crevices during the day. It is usually seen in pairs, and occasionally in schools in some oceanic locations.

Distribution
This species can be found in the Indo-West Pacific.

Habitat
The Blacktip soldierfish inhabits protected waters at depths between 25 and 71 meters, usually in silty reef areas and well developed coral reefs with clear water.

References

External links
 

botche
Fish described in 1829
Taxa named by Georges Cuvier